The following are international rankings of Italy.

Cities

Rome: ranked 9; Time Out's Top Ten cities in the world 2009, Timesonline
Milan: ranked 1; Top Fashion Capital 2009, The Global Language Monitor

Demographics

Population: ranked 23
Population density: ranked 58
Total fertility rate: ranked 205
Birth rate: ranked 221
Mortality rate: ranked 57

Economy

World Economic Forum 2013–2014 Global Competitiveness Report: ranked 49 out of 148 countries
Nominal Gross Domestic Product: ranked 7
Public debt: ranked 7 at 104% of GDP
PPP Gross Domestic Product: ranked 10
Economic growth rate: ranked 195 at 1.40%
Labour force participation: 23rd in the world (24,740,000 workers).
Unemployment: 78th lowest at 6.20%
Index of Economic Freedom: ranked 64

Geography

Total area: ranked 71
World Resources Institute length of coastline: ranked 28 out of 149 countries

Health

Infant mortality rate: ranked 16
Life expectancy: ranked 18
HIV/AIDS adult prevalence rate: ranked 73 at 0.5%
Total HIV/AIDS adult infections: ranked 42 at 140,000

Infrastructure

International Union of Railways: Rail transport network size: ranked 17
CIA World Factbook: road network size 2004, ranked 14
CIA World Factbook: number of airports 2007, ranked 46
CIA World Factbook: waterways length ranked 40

Military

Military expenditures: ranked 12th

Politics

Economist Intelligence Unit 2019 Democracy Index: ranked 35th out of 167 countries
Transparency International 2019 Corruption Perceptions Index: ranked 51st out of 177 countries
Freedom House 2017 Freedom of the Press (report): ranked 62nd out of 197 countries and territories

Religion

5th most Christian country in the world by percent of population (47,690,000; 90%)
5th most Roman Catholic country in the world by percent of population (55,599,000; 97.20% of all Italian Christians)

Society

Quality-of-Life Index: ranked 21st
 Average IQ: ranked 1st in Europe and 4th the world.
Alcohol consumption: ranked 87th
University of Leicester Satisfaction with Life Index 2006, ranked 50th out of 178 countries
United Nations Development Programme 2019 Human Development Index ranked 29th out of 187

Sports

Association football: Italian men's team are 10th in the world in FIFA World Rankings, and 6th in the world in World Football Elo Ratings
Italian women's team are 14th in the world in FIFA Women's World Rankings
Basketball: Italy national basketball team are 12th in the world in FIBA World Rankings
Cricket: Italian cricket team are 30th in the world.
6th most successful nation on the All-time Olympic Games medal table (combined summer and winter)
6th most successful nation on the All-time Olympic Games medal table (summer games).
12th most successful nation on the All-time Olympic Games medal table (winter games).
Rugby league: Italy national rugby league team are 13th in the world on the RLIF World Rankings
Rugby Union: Italy national rugby union team are 14th in the world on the IRB World Rankings
Water Polo: Italy men's national water polo team are 4th in the world on the FINA Water Polo World Rankings
Water Polo: Italy women's national water polo team are 5th in the world on the FINA Water Polo World Rankings
Volleyball: Italy men's national volleyball team are 7th in the world on the FIVB World Rankings
Italy women's national volleyball team are 4th in the world in the FIVB World Rankings

Tourism

World Economic Forum 2013 Travel & Tourism Competitiveness Index: ranked 26 out of 140 economies
United Nations World Tourism Organization 2012 international tourism receipts: ranked 5
United Nations World Tourism Organization 2012 international tourism expenditures: ranked 10

See also
Lists of countries
Lists by country
List of international rankings

References

Italy